Snellenia flavipennis is a species of moth of the Stathmopodidae family. It was described by Cajetan Felder, Rudolf Felder and Alois Friedrich Rogenhofer in 1875.

Taxonomy
The species was described from a specimen of dubious provenance ["Amer. ?"]. Walsingham concluded it is closely related to Snellenia sesioides (now considered a synonym of Snellenia lineata) from Australia. Hence Becker (1984) considered that the original specimen, which is presumably lost, may have come from Australia. Previously, it was thought to be Neotropical. The status of the species is currently unknown.

References

Moths described in 1875
Stathmopodidae
Taxa named by Alois Friedrich Rogenhofer